The American Church of St. John was a church building constructed in Dresden for the expatriate American community in 1883 to 1884. It was damaged by bombing in 1945 and demolished in 1959.

References 

Episcopal (ECUSA) church buildings in Europe
Buildings and structures demolished in 1959
John's